Pandemonium is the seventh studio album by gothic industrial metal band Gothminister, released on 21 October 2022 on the label AFM Records.

Track listing

References 

2022 albums
Gothminister albums
AFM Records albums